Norden is a surname. Notable people with the surname include:

 Albert Norden (1904–1982), German politician
 Bengt Nordén (born 1945), Swedish chemist
 Betsy Norden (born 1945), American opera singer
 Caren Norden, German biophysicist 
 Carl Norden (1880–1965), engineer, responsible for designing the Norden bombsight
 Cecily Norden (1918–2011), South African author, horse judge, rider, and breeder
 Christine Norden (1924–1988), British actress
 Claes Nordén (born 1993), Swedish professional ice hockey player
 Denis Norden (1922–2018), British comedy writer and television presenter
 Eduard Norden (1868–1941), German philologist and historian of religion
 Francisco Norden (born 1929), Colombian film director
 Frederic Louis Norden (1708–1742), Danish captain and explorer
 Gustaf Nordén (1884–1947), Swedish athlete
 Harald Norden (born 1933), German speed skater 
 Heinz Norden (1905–1978), American author
 John Norden (c. 1547–1625), English topographer
 John Norden (MP) (1612–1669), English lawyer and politician 
 Lisa Nordén (born 1984), Swedish professional triathlete
 Marie Nordén (born 1967), Swedish politician
 Richard Norden (1879–1952), South African cricketer
 Robert Norden (c. 1650–1725), Baptist preacher 
 Robert Nordén (1926–1998), Norwegian economist and politician
 Tommy Norden (born 1952), American actor
 Virginia Norden (1879–1948), American actress

German-language surnames